Bhagwan Mahavir University is a Private university located in  Surat, Gujarat, India. It was established in 2001 under the Gujarat Private Universities Act, 2009.

References

Universities in Gujarat
Private universities in India
2001 establishments in Gujarat
Educational institutions established in 2001